Sentimental Journey is the second album by singer-actress Emmy Rossum and her first album in six years. Unlike her first album, in which she co-wrote every song but one, Sentimental Journey is a cover album and includes songs from the 1920s through the 1960s. Sentimental Journey features many of the same people who worked on her first album, including producer Stuart Brawley and musician Joe Corcoran. "Pretty Paper" was the first single from the album and was released as a digital single on November 27, 2012. Rather than traditional music videos, "vignettes" were filmed and released to promote the album and feature Rossum in early 1900s clothing and setting with songs from the album playing in the background.

Rossum promoted the album by performing "These Foolish Things (Remind Me of You)" on The View and on Entertainment Tonight. Other media appearances in support of the album included performances on Access Hollywood on January 25, Conan on January 28, Chelsea Lately on January 29, and The Late Late Show with Craig Ferguson on February 6.

Track listing

Personnel
 Emmy Rossum — Vocals
 Stuart Brawley — Producer, mixer, melodica, organ, bells, percussion
 Joe Corcoran — Acoustic guitar, electric guitar, banjo, percussion
 Giulio Carmassi — Arranger, Melodica, horns, piano, organ, vibraphone
 Nikki Garcia — Violin
 Cameron Stone — Cello
 Matt Mayhall — Drums, percussion
 Sam Jones — Photography

Engineered by Drew Harris, Giulio Carmassi, and Stuart Brawley. Recorded at The Backyard Recording Studios and The Village Recorder.

Chart positions

Album

References

External links
 Official Site

2013 albums
Emmy Rossum albums
Warner Records albums
Covers albums
Traditional pop albums